A statue of military historian Samuel Eliot Morison by Penelope Jencks is installed along Boston's Commonwealth Avenue Mall, in the U.S. state of Massachusetts.

Description and history
The 1982 bronze sculpture, installed on a granite base, depicts Morison holding binoculars; at his feet are bronze casts of crabs, shells, and starfish. It was surveyed as part of the Smithsonian Institution's "Save Outdoor Sculpture!" program in 1993.

See also

 1982 in art

References

External links
 

1982 establishments in Massachusetts
1982 sculptures
Bronze sculptures in Massachusetts
Crustaceans in art
Granite sculptures in Massachusetts
Monuments and memorials in Boston
Outdoor sculptures in Boston
Sculptures of men in Massachusetts
Seashells in art
Statues in Boston